Lemminkäinen's Mother (Lemminkäisen äiti) is an 1897 Romantic nationalist painting by Finnish painter Akseli Gallen-Kallela. The painting illustrates a passage from the Kalevala, the Finnish national epic compiled by Elias Lönnrot in the 19th century.

The painting depicts a scene from a poem where the hero Lemminkäinen has died and his mother has dredged the pieces of her son's lifeless body from the river of Tuonela and sewn them together again. She is shown with the body in pietà style, waiting for the bee, a messenger of the god Ukko, to bring her honey from the gods to bring her son to life again.

References

1896 paintings
Works based on the Kalevala
Works based on European myths and legends
Paintings by Akseli Gallen-Kallela
Paintings in the collection of the Ateneum
Mythological paintings
Birds in art
Skulls in art
Paintings about death